Leslie Rawlins (born 28 June 1954) is a Trinidad former cyclist. He competed in the sprint event at the 1976 Summer Olympics.

References

External links
 

1954 births
Living people
Trinidad and Tobago male cyclists
Olympic cyclists of Trinidad and Tobago
Cyclists at the 1976 Summer Olympics
20th-century Trinidad and Tobago people